DJ-Kicks: Daddy G is a DJ mix album, mixed by Daddy G of the band Massive Attack. It was released on 25 October 2004 on the Studio !K7 independent record label as part of the DJ-Kicks series.

Track listing
 "Intro" – Philip Levi & Tippa Irie – 0:16
 "Armagideon Time" – Willie Williams – 2:22
 "Rockfort Rock" – Sound Dimension – 0:13
 "Non Non Non" – Melaaz – 3:47
 "Aftermath (Version 1)" (featuring Martina Topley-Bird) – Tricky – 5:36
 "Just Kissed My Baby" – The Meters – 4:42
 "Mustt Mustt" (Massive Attack remix) – Nusrat Fateh Ali Khan – 3:31
 "Face A La Mer" (Massive Attack remix) – Les Negresses Vertes – 5:28
 "Karmacoma" (The Napoli Trip) (featuring Almamegretta, remixed by Ben Young) – Massive Attack – 6:07
 "Budy Bye" – Johnny Osbourne – 4:22
 "Signs" (Dubplate mix) – Badmarsh & Shri – 5:31
 "Here I Come" (Dubplate version) – Barrington Levy – 3:47
 "Oh Yeah" – Foxy Brown – 3:59
 "Inspection (Check One)" – Leftfield – 6:27
 "I Against I" – Massive Attack & Mos Def – 5:23
 "Rock Steady" (Danny Krivit edit) – Aretha Franklin – 4:30
 "Unfinished Sympathy" (Paul Oakenfold Perfecto mix) – Massive Attack – 5:27

References

External links 
DJ-Kicks website

Daddy G
2004 compilation albums
Studio !K7 albums